The Aneto glacier (Aragonese: Glaciar d'Aneto, Spanish : Glaciar del Aneto) is a glacier located on the northwestern flank of Aneto in the Pyrenees. It is the greatest glacier in the Pyrenees and the Iberian Peninsula and the 8th southernmost glacier in Europe.

See also
Southernmost glacial mass in Europe
List of glaciers in Europe

Glaciers of Spain
Glaciers of the Pyrenees